GCE Group is a  gas-equipment company based in Zug, Switzerland. 

GCE is the leading manufacturer of gas control equipment. 

Driven by innovation, it delivers the highest quality gas products and services to businesses across the globe. With manufacturing, sales and supply companies located all over the world, customers can always access the world’s leading innovative gas control equipment. 

Specialising in five business areas, GCE Group focuses its expertise across; cutting & welding technologies, valves, healthcare, homecare and specialty gas systems.

Business segments
The company is organized into four business segments:
 Cutting and welding
 Valves
 Healthcare
 Homecare
 Specialty gas systems

Brands
GCE Group’s portfolio includes sub-brands such as:
 GCE Healthcare
 GCE Druva
 Zen-O and Zen-O lite

References

External links
Official global website 

Industrial breathing sets
Rebreather makers